Eh La Bas is a traditional New Orleans song. Originally it was sung with Creole lyrics but was later given French lyrics and the common title from the French lyrics. There have been numerous versions, including English lyrics that refer to both the Creole and French versions, and all employ a call and response.

Lyrics
Original Louisiana Creole lyrics and English translation:

French lyrics and English translation:

English lyrics 
English lyrics by Louis Brown and Bob Stevens:

 Eh la bas (Eh la bas)
 Eh la bas (Eh la bas)
 Eh la bas (Eh la bas)
 Eh la bas (Eh la bas)
 Tra-la-la (Tra-la-la)
 Sis-Boom-Bah (Sis-Boom-Bah)
 Eh la bas (Eh la bas)
 Eh la bas (Eh la bas)

 Well, I can't speak French, not in a pinch, so I don't know what it means.
 But it sounds real good, like I know it would, like down in New Orleans.
 I love to hear that clarinet burn, and hear them trambone glisses,
 I'd like to sing French when I take my turn, but that ain't the kinda' band that this is!

 Kid Ory sang that Cajun French in a fine ol' Creole way,
 but the only Cajun I can say is "Laissez les bons temps rouler!"
 So let the good times roll my friends, and let the music play,
 Tomorrow may never come to be, so let's live it up today!

Versions
As a traditional song it has no copyright and its origins are uncertain. It has been widely recorded by New Orleans bands since the 1940s:
 The Creole Stompers — 1944
 Kid Ory's Creole Jazz Band — 1946
 Paul Barbarin — 1955
 Chris Barber's Jazz Band with Billie and De De Pierce in Preservation Hall, New Orleans — 1959
 The Original Tuxedo Jass Band — 1964
 Moise and Alida Viator with Eh, La-Bas! - 2003
 Preservation Hall Jazz Band

See also
Music of New Orleans

References

American music history
Music of New Orleans
Year of song unknown
Songwriter unknown